Ab Zangi (also Romanized as Āb Zangī) is a village in Derak Rural District, in the Central District of Shiraz County, Fars Province, Iran. At the 2006 census, its population was 552, in 142 families.

References 

Populated places in Shiraz County